Whitewalls may refer to:

 Whitewall tires
 A shopping street in Swansea City Centre, Wales, United Kingdom